The 1992–93 NBA season was the 25th season for the Phoenix Suns in the National Basketball Association. This season is most memorable for the Suns acquiring All-Star power forward Charles Barkley from the Philadelphia 76ers, and signing free agent Danny Ainge prior to the season. Under new head coach Paul Westphal, the Suns had a successful season posting a 14-game winning streak in December, which led them to a 21–4 start, held a 38–10 record at the All-Star break, then posted an 11-game winning streak between March and April to finish with an NBA-best 62–20 record. The team set the franchise record for most wins in a season (the record was later tied in the 2004–05 season and later broken in the 2021-22 NBA season). Barkley won the NBA Most Valuable Player Award, and led the team to its second trip to the NBA Finals, where they lost to Michael Jordan, Scottie Pippen and the 2-time defending champion Chicago Bulls in six games.

In the Western Conference First Round of the playoffs, the Suns faced elimination as they trailed 2–0 against the 8th-seeded Los Angeles Lakers. However, they won the next three games, including a 112–104 overtime home win in Game 5 to advance in the Western Conference Semi-finals, where they defeated the 5th-seeded San Antonio Spurs in six games. In the Western Conference Finals, they defeated the Seattle SuperSonics in a full seven-game series, on their way to the Finals before losing in six games to the Bulls.

Barkley led the Suns in scoring and rebounding with 25.6 points and 12.1 rebounds per game, and also contributed 1.6 steals per game, and was named to the All-NBA First Team, while Dan Majerle finished second on the team in scoring with 16.9 points per game, contributed 1.7 steals per game, and finished tied in first place in the league with 167 three-point field goals, while being named to the NBA All-Defensive Second Team. Barkley and Majerle were both selected for the 1993 NBA All-Star Game, with Westphal coaching the Western Conference. In addition, point guard Kevin Johnson only played just 49 games due to hamstring and knee injuries, averaging 16.1 points, 7.8 assists and 1.7 steals per game, and rookie forward Richard Dumas (who was suspended for all of the previous season for violating the NBA's substance abuse policy), contributed 15.8 points, led the Suns with 1.8 steals per game and was selected to the NBA All-Rookie Second Team, despite only playing just 48 games due to injury. Cedric Ceballos provided the team with 12.8 points and 5.5 rebounds per game, while off the bench, sixth man Tom Chambers provided with 12.2 points and 4.7 rebounds per game, Ainge contributed 11.8 points per game and 150 three-point field goals, and first round draft pick Oliver Miller led the team with 1.8 blocks per game. Following the season, Chambers signed as a free agent with the Utah Jazz.

The season saw the debut of the new "Streaking Sun" logo, which was featured on the front of the team's new jerseys. The new primary logo and uniforms would both remain in use until 2000. The season was also the Suns first at the new America West Arena (later renamed Talking Stick Resort Arena). The new arena had a regular season attendance of 779,943 in 41 home games, the fifth highest total attendance in the league. The team sold-out the capacity 19,023 arena every game of the season.

This was the last time the Suns would make the NBA Finals until the 2020–21 season.

Offseason

NBA Draft

The Suns used their first-round pick to select center Oliver Miller from Arkansas. Miller averaged 12.2 points and 6.5 rebounds per game through four years with the Razorbacks. Miller would go on to play two seasons with the Suns before signing with the Detroit Pistons as a free agent in 1994. He would later return to the Suns in the 1999–2000 season. Second-round picks Brian Davis and Ron Ellis were not signed by the Suns. Davis would later play with the Minnesota Timberwolves in the 1993–94 season, while Ellis never played in the NBA.

Trades

On June 17, 1992, the Suns traded former All-Star Jeff Hornacek, Tim Perry, and Andrew Lang to the Philadelphia 76ers for All-Star forward Charles Barkley. Barkley would play four seasons with the Suns before being traded to the Houston Rockets in 1996. Hornacek would play less than two seasons with the Sixers, Perry would play less than four, and Lang only one. Many consider the trade to be the best in Suns history.

Free agency
The Suns key off-season signing was veteran shooting guard Danny Ainge. Ainge would spend his last three seasons in the NBA with the Suns. Point guard Frank Johnson was signed to back-up All-Star Kevin Johnson. Forward/center Tim Kempton was signed, but played sparingly throughout the season. Small forward Alex Stivrins was picked up in the off-season, but later waived. He would return with two 10-day contracts later in the season, but was again waived.

Roster

Regular season
In 1992, the Suns moved into their new arena in downtown Phoenix, the America West Arena (now Footprint Center). The arena was not the only new arrival into Phoenix though, as flamboyant all-star power forward Charles Barkley was traded from the Philadelphia 76ers for Jeff Hornacek, Andrew Lang, and Tim Perry. Barkley would go on to win his first and only MVP in his first year with Phoenix in 1993.

In addition to Barkley, the Suns added some key players to their roster, amongst them Danny Ainge. The organization also drafted a player out of UArkansas: center Oliver Miller. Also making his Suns debut was their 1991 first round draft pick, Oklahoma State forward Richard Dumas, who missed the previous season due to a drug-related suspension.

Season standings

Record vs. opponents

Game log

|- bgcolor=ccffcc
| 1
| November 7
| L.A. Clippers
| W 111–105
| Charles Barkley (37)
| Charles Barkley (21)
| Charles Barkley (8)
| America West Arena19,023
| 1–0
|- bgcolor=ffcccc
| 2
| November 10
| @ Portland
| L 89–100
| Charles Barkley (21)
| Charles Barkley (14)
| Negele Knight (9)
| Memorial Coliseum12,888
| 1–1
|- bgcolor=ccffcc
| 3
| November 12
| @ Utah
| W 102–91
| Charles Barkley (25)
| Charles Barkley (14)
| Charles Barkley,Dan Majerle (5)
| Delta Center19,911
| 2–1
|- bgcolor=ccffcc
| 4
| November 14
| @ Minnesota
| W 108–101
| Tom Chambers (28)
| Charles Barkley (13)
| Dan Majerle (6)
| Target Center19,006
| 3–1
|- bgcolor=ccffcc
| 5
| November 16
| Seattle
| W 117–108
| Charles Barkley (28)
| Charles Barkley (12)
| Negele Knight (7)
| America West Arena19,023
| 4–1
|- bgcolor=ccffcc
| 6
| November 18
| Sacramento
| W 127–111
| Cedric Ceballos (30)
| Cedric Ceballos (13)
| Oliver Miller,Alex Stivrins (5)
| America West Arena19,023
| 5–1
|- bgcolor=ffcccc
| 7
| November 21
| @ L.A. Clippers
| L 107–111
| Charles Barkley (44)
| Charles Barkley (17)
| Kevin Johnson (7)
| Los Angeles Memorial Sports Arena14,419
| 5–2
|- bgcolor=ffcccc
| 8
| November 22
| Chicago
| L 111–128
| Charles Barkley (22)
| Charles Barkley (9)
| Kevin Johnson (8)
| America West Arena19,023
| 5–3
|- bgcolor=ccffcc
| 9
| November 25
| Portland
| W 121–117
| Charles Barkley (33)
| Charles Barkley (18)
| Charles Barkley (6)
| America West Arena19,023
| 6–3
|- bgcolor=ccffcc
| 10
| November 27
| Golden State
| W 121–107
| Charles Barkley (29)
| Charles Barkley (11)
| Frank Johnson (9)
| America West Arena19,023
| 7–3
|- bgcolor=ffcccc
| 11
| November 28
| @ Golden State
| L 131–134
| Charles Barkley (28)
| Charles Barkley (18)
| Dan Majerle (7)
| Oakland–Alameda County Coliseum Arena15,025
| 7–4

|- bgcolor=ccffcc
| 12
| December 1
| Charlotte
| W 109–90
| Cedric Ceballos (20)
| Charles Barkley (14)
| Charles Barkley (7)
| America West Arena19,023
| 8–4
|- bgcolor=ccffcc
| 13
| December 4
| L.A. Lakers
| W 103–93
| Charles Barkley (19)
| Charles Barkley (9)
| Frank Johnson (5)
| America West Arena19,023
| 9–4
|- bgcolor=ccffcc
| 14
| December 6
| @ Milwaukee
| W 122–112
| Negele Knight (22)
| Charles Barkley (14)
| Negele Knight (7)
| Bradley Center16,646
| 10–4
|- bgcolor=ccffcc
| 15
| December 8
| @ New Jersey
| W 105–100
| Charles Barkley (34)
| Charles Barkley (12)
| Charles Barkley (6)
| Meadowlands Arena16,514
| 11–4
|- bgcolor=ccffcc
| 16
| December 9
| @ Charlotte
| W 110–101
| Charles Barkley (23)
| Charles Barkley (12)
| Charles Barkley (10)
| Charlotte Coliseum23,698
| 12–4
|- bgcolor=ccffcc
| 17
| December 11
| @ Orlando
| W 108–107
| Tom Chambers (27)
| Charles Barkley (11)
| Danny Ainge (9)
| Orlando Arena15,151
| 13–4
|- bgcolor=ccffcc
| 18
| December 12
| @ Miami
| W 122–118
| Charles Barkley (39)
| Charles Barkley (10)
| Danny Ainge,Dan Majerle,Oliver Miller (5)
| Miami Arena15,008
| 14–4
|- bgcolor=ccffcc
| 19
| December 15
| Washington
| W 125–110
| Charles Barkley (36)
| Charles Barkley (10)
| Dan Majerle (9)
| America West Arena19,023
| 15–4
|- bgcolor=ccffcc
| 20
| December 18
| @ L.A. Lakers
| W 116–100
| Charles Barkley (25)
| Charles Barkley (23)
| Negele Knight,Dan Majerle (7)
| Great Western Forum16,734
| 16–4
|- bgcolor=ccffcc
| 21
| December 22
| Golden State
| W 106–104
| Charles Barkley (35)
| Charles Barkley (16)
| Dan Majerle (5)
| America West Arena19,023
| 17–4
|- bgcolor=ccffcc
| 22
| December 23
| @ Denver
| W 111–96
| Dan Majerle (25)
| Cedric Ceballos (11)
| Dan Majerle (5)
| McNichols Sports Arenan/a
| 18–4
|- bgcolor=ccffcc
| 23
| December 26
| Seattle
| W 113–110
| Charles Barkley (33)
| Charles Barkley (13)
| Negele Knight,Dan Majerle (5)
| America West Arena19,023
| 19–4
|- bgcolor=ccffcc
| 24
| December 27
| Denver
| W 129–88
| Richard Dumas (27)
| Cedric Ceballos (12)
| Kevin Johnson (12)
| America West Arena19,023
| 20–4
|- bgcolor=ccffcc
| 25
| December 30
| Houston
| W 133–110
| Charles Barkley,Kevin Johnson,Dan Majerle (25)
| Charles Barkley (17)
| Charles Barkley,Kevin Johnson (10)
| America West Arena19,023
| 21–4

|- bgcolor=ffcccc
| 26
| January 3
| @ San Antonio
| L 113–114 (OT)
| Charles Barkley (31)
| Charles Barkley (12)
| Kevin Johnson (8)
| HemisFair Arena16,057
| 21–5
|- bgcolor=ccffcc
| 27
| January 5
| @ Houston
| W 106–104
| Charles Barkley (29)
| Charles Barkley (8)
| Charles Barkley (10)
| The Summit13,755
| 22–5
|- bgcolor=ccffcc
| 28
| January 7
| @ Dallas
| W 111–107
| Charles Barkley (32)
| Charles Barkley (14)
| Charles Barkley,Dan Majerle (6)
| Reunion Arena13,750
| 23–5
|- bgcolor=ffcccc
| 29
| December 12
| @ Seattle
| L 113–122
| Charles Barkley (27)
| Charles Barkley (11)
| Kevin Johnson (8)
| Seattle Center Coliseum14,812
| 23–6
|- bgcolor=ccffcc
| 30
| January 14
| @ Sacramento
| W 114–104
| Richard Dumas,Dan Majerle (23)
| Dan Majerle,Oliver Miller (9)
| Kevin Johnson (8)
| ARCO Arena17,317
| 24–6
|- bgcolor=ccffcc
| 31
| January 15
| Miami
| W 107–99
| Charles Barkley (31)
| Charles Barkley (10)
| Kevin Johnson,Dan Majerle (5)
| America West Arena19,023
| 25–6
|- bgcolor=ffcccc
| 32
| January 18
| @ New York
| L 103–106
| Charles Barkley (27)
| Charles Barkley (15)
| Kevin Johnson (9)
| Madison Square Garden19,763
| 25–7
|- bgcolor=ffcccc
| 33
| January 20
| @ Cleveland
| L 119–123
| Richard Dumas (23)
| Mark West (12)
| Cedric Ceballos (5)
| Coliseum at Richfield20,273
| 25–8
|- bgcolor=ccffcc
| 34
| January 22
| @ Washington
| W 122–115
| Richard Dumas (26)
| Charles Barkley (9)
| Charles Barkley (7)
| Capital Centre18,756
| 26–8
|- bgcolor=ccffcc
| 35
| January 23
| @ Atlanta
| W 110–91
| Charles Barkley (32)
| Charles Barkley (16)
| Kevin Johnson (7)
| Omni Coliseum16,531
| 27–8
|- bgcolor=ccffcc
| 36
| January 25
| @ Detroit
| W 121–119
| Charles Barkley,Kevin Johnson (24)
| Richard Dumas (11)
| Kevin Johnson (9)
| The Palace of Auburn Hills21,454
| 28–8
|- bgcolor=ccffcc
| 37
| January 27
| @ Minnesota
| W 117–116 (OT)
| Charles Barkley (35)
| Charles Barkley (24)
| Kevin Johnson (7)
| Target Center18,503
| 29–8
|- bgcolor=ccffcc
| 38
| January 29
| San Antonio
| W 125–110
| Danny Ainge (26)
| Charles Barkley (11)
| Kevin Johnson (11)
| America West Arena19,023
| 30–8
|- bgcolor=ccffcc
| 39
| January 30
| Dallas
| W 126–105
| Dan Majerle (30)
| Charles Barkley (14)
| Kevin Johnson (7)
| America West Arena19,023
| 31–8

|- bgcolor=ffcccc
| 40
| February 2
| @ L.A. Clippers
| L 108–112
| Kevin Johnson (23)
| Mark West (12)
| Charles Barkley,Kevin Johnson (6)
| Los Angeles Memorial Sports Arena15,989
| 31–9
|- bgcolor=ccffcc
| 41
| February 3
| Minnesota
| W 122–102
| Danny Ainge (19)
| Charles Barkley (14)
| Kevin Johnson (8)
| America West Arena19,023
| 32–9
|- bgcolor=ccffcc
| 42
| February 5
| L.A. Lakers
| W 132–104
| Dan Majerle (29)
| Richard Dumas (9)
| Charles Barkley,Kevin Johnson (6)
| America West Arena19,023
| 33–9
|- bgcolor=ccffcc
| 43
| February 7
| Orlando
| W 121–105
| Richard Dumas (31)
| Charles Barkley (19)
| Danny Ainge,Kevin Johnson (9)
| America West Arena19,023
| 34–9
|- bgcolor=ccffcc
| 44
| February 10
| L.A. Clippers
| W 122–100
| Charles Barkley (22)
| Charles Barkley (13)
| Charles Barkley (8)
| America West Arena19,023
| 35–9
|- bgcolor=ccffcc
| 45
| February 11
| @ Golden State
| W 122–100
| Danny Ainge (33)
| Charles Barkley (19)
| Kevin Johnson (12)
| Oakland–Alameda County Coliseum Arena15,025
| 36–9
|- bgcolor=ffcccc
| 46
| February 13
| @ Seattle
| L 94–95
| Charles Barkley (33)
| Charles Barkley (8)
| Charles Barkley (8)
| Seattle Center Coliseum14,812
| 36–10
|- bgcolor=ccffcc
| 47
| February 16
| Boston
| W 110–97
| Charles Barkley (32)
| Charles Barkley,Tom Chambers (12)
| Charles Barkley (9)
| America West Arena19,023
| 37–10
|- bgcolor=ccffcc
| 48
| February 18
| Atlanta
| W 131–119
| Richard Dumas (32)
| Charles Barkley (16)
| Charles Barkley (12)
| America West Arena19,023
| 38–10
|- align="center"
|colspan="9" bgcolor="#bbcaff"|All-Star Break
|- bgcolor=ccffcc
| 49
| February 23
| @ San Antonio
| W 105–103
| Charles Barkley (29)
| Charles Barkley (12)
| Danny Ainge (7)
| HemisFair Arena16,057
| 39–10
|- bgcolor=ffcccc
| 50
| February 25
| @ Houston
| L 104–131
| Richard Dumas (21)
| Charles Barkley,Richard Dumas (8)
| Danny Ainge,Charles Barkley,Negele Knight (4)
| The Summit16,611
| 39–11
|- bgcolor=ccffcc
| 51
| February 26
| Utah
| W 113–106
| Charles Barkley (29)
| Charles Barkley (11)
| Charles Barkley (11)
| America West Arena19,023
| 40–11
|- bgcolor=ffcccc
| 52
| February 28
| Cleveland
| L 94–101
| Charles Barkley (27)
| Charles Barkley (19)
| Charles Barkley (11)
| America West Arena19,023
| 40–12

|- bgcolor=ffcccc
| 53
| March 2
| @ Portland
| L 97–102
| Charles Barkley,Dan Majerle (20)
| Charles Barkley (12)
| Dan Majerle (7)
| Memorial Coliseum12,888
| 40–13
|- bgcolor=ccffcc
| 54
| March 3
| Philadelphia
| W 125–115
| Charles Barkley (36)
| Charles Barkley (17)
| Charles Barkley (9)
| America West Arena19,023
| 41–13
|- bgcolor=ccffcc
| 55
| March 5
| Sacramento
| W 130–122
| Charles Barkley (32)
| Mark West (12)
| Kevin Johnson (6)
| America West Arena19,023
| 42–13
|- bgcolor=ccffcc
| 56
| March 6
| @ Dallas
| W 109–102
| Kevin Johnson (28)
| Charles Barkley (15)
| Kevin Johnson (7)
| Reunion Arena17,502
| 43–13
|- bgcolor=ccffcc
| 57
| March 9
| @ Sacramento
| W 128–108
| Cedric Ceballos (40)
| Cedric Ceballos (12)
| Kevin Johnson (12)
| ARCO Arena17,317
| 44–13
|- bgcolor=ccffcc
| 58
| March 10
| Golden State
| W 111–100
| Charles Barkley (30)
| Mark West (13)
| Kevin Johnson (8)
| America West Arena19,023
| 45–13
|- bgcolor=ccffcc
| 59
| March 12
| Dallas
| W 116–98
| Cedric Ceballos (24)
| Charles Barkley,Cedric Ceballos (9)
| Kevin Johnson (9)
| America West Arena19,023
| 46–13
|- bgcolor=ffcccc
| 60
| March 13
| New Jersey
| L 93–124
| Kevin Johnson (23)
| Cedric Ceballos,Tom Chambers,Jerrod Mustaf (7)
| Kevin Johnson (6)
| America West Arena19,023
| 46–14
|- bgcolor=ccffcc
| 61
| March 17
| Portland
| W 129–111
| Cedric Ceballos,Tom Chambers (24)
| Cedric Ceballos (14)
| Kevin Johnson (14)
| America West Arena19,023
| 47–14
|- bgcolor=ccffcc
| 62
| March 19
| Detroit
| W 127–97
| Danny Ainge (23)
| Charles Barkley (16)
| Dan Majerle (9)
| America West Arena19,023
| 48–14
|- bgcolor=ffcccc
| 63
| March 21
| Indiana
| L 108–109
| Charles Barkley (38)
| Charles Barkley,Mark West (9)
| Kevin Johnson (11)
| America West Arena19,023
| 48–15
|- bgcolor=ccffcc
| 64
| March 23
| New York
| W 121–92
| Charles Barkley (31)
| Cedric Ceballos (12)
| Frank Johnson (7)
| America West Arena19,023
| 49–15
|- bgcolor=ccffcc
| 65
| March 24
| @ L.A. Lakers
| W 120–105
| Charles Barkley (33)
| Charles Barkley (12)
| Charles Barkley (8)
| Great Western Forum17,505
| 50–15
|- bgcolor=ccffcc
| 66
| March 26
| Milwaukee
| W 109–103
| Charles Barkley (31)
| Charles Barkley (15)
| Frank Johnson (8)
| America West Arena19,023
| 51–15
|- bgcolor=ccffcc
| 67
| March 28
| @ Philadelphia
| W 110–100
| Charles Barkley (35)
| Cedric Ceballos (15)
| Kevin Johnson (8)
| The Spectrum18,168
| 52–15
|- bgcolor=ccffcc
| 68
| March 30
| @ Chicago
| W 113–109
| Cedric Ceballos (27)
| Mark West (10)
| Kevin Johnson (16)
| Chicago Stadium18,676
| 53–15

|- bgcolor=ccffcc
| 69
| April 2
| @ Boston
| W 118–114
| Charles Barkley (37)
| Charles Barkley (11)
| Kevin Johnson (9)
| Boston Garden14,890
| 54–15
|- bgcolor=ccffcc
| 70
| April 4
| @ Indiana
| W 110–100
| Charles Barkley (32)
| Charles Barkley (13)
| Kevin Johnson (8)
| Market Square Arena16,530
| 55–15
|- bgcolor=ccffcc
| 71
| April 6
| L.A. Lakers
| W 115–114
| Kevin Johnson (32)
| Charles Barkley (11)
| Dan Majerle (8)
| America West Arena19,023
| 56–15
|- bgcolor=ccffcc
| 72
| April 8
| @ Sacramento
| W 123–114
| Cedric Ceballos (28)
| Mark West (13)
| Kevin Johnson (7)
| ARCO Arena
| 57–15
|- bgcolor=ccffcc
| 73
| April 9
| Denver
| W 98–97
| Charles Barkley (26)
| Charles Barkley (19)
| Charles Barkley (12)
| America West Arena19,023
| 58–15
|- bgcolor=ccffcc
| 74
| April 11
| Utah
| W 112–99
| Kevin Johnson (29)
| Charles Barkley (7)
| Kevin Johnson (9)
| America West Arena19,023
| 59–15
|- bgcolor=ffcccc
| 75
| April 12
| @ L.A. Clippers
| L 104–111
| Richard Dumas (28)
| Richard Dumas (12)
| Danny Ainge,Dan Majerle (6)
| Los Angeles Memorial Sports Arena15,989
| 59–16
|- bgcolor=ccffcc
| 76
| April 14
| Minnesota
| W 98–84
| Dan Majerle (25)
| Cedric Ceballos (13)
| Kevin Johnson (10)
| America West Arena19,023
| 60–16
|- bgcolor=ffcccc
| 77
| April 16
| Seattle
| L 102–108
| Cedric Ceballos (21)
| Tom Chambers,Jerrod Mustaf (7)
| Kevin Johnson,Dan Majerle (7)
| America West Arena19,023
| 60–17
|- bgcolor=ffcccc
| 78
| April 17
| @ Utah
| L 101–110
| Cedric Ceballos (25)
| Cedric Ceballos (10)
| Negele Knight (6)
| Delta Center19,911
| 60–18
|- bgcolor=ffcccc
| 79
| April 19
| Houston
| L 97–111
| Kevin Johnson (18)
| Jerrod Mustaf (8)
| Kevin Johnson (7)
| America West Arena19,023
| 60–19
|- bgcolor=ccffcc
| 80
| April 22
| @ Portland
| W 115–114
| Charles Barkley (25)
| Cedric Ceballos (9)
| Kevin Johnson (14)
| Memorial Coliseum12,888
| 61–19
|- bgcolor=ccffcc
| 81
| April 24
| San Antonio
| W 99–97
| Richard Dumas (23)
| Cedric Ceballos (11)
| Danny Ainge,Frank Johnson,Negele Knight (6)
| America West Arena19,023
| 62–19
|- bgcolor=ffcccc
| 82
| April 25
| @ Denver
| L 118–120
| Richard Dumas (25)
| Charles Barkley (10)
| Danny Ainge (7)
| McNichols Sports Arena17,022
| 62–20

Playoffs
Under rookie head coach Paul Westphal (a former Suns assistant and, as a player, member of the 1976 Suns squad that went to the NBA Finals), the Suns squad consisting mostly of Barkley, Majerle, Johnson and Ainge won 62 games that year. After eliminating the Lakers (against whom they came back from an 0–2 deficit preventing them from being the first eight-seeded team to eliminate the top seeded team in the first round), Spurs, and Sonics, the Suns advanced to the Finals for the second time in franchise history. They eventually lost to the Bulls, led by Michael Jordan and Scottie Pippen. This series included a triple-overtime game (Game 3) that along with game 5 of the 1976 series are the only triple overtime games in the history of the NBA finals. Approximately 300,000 fans braved the 105 degree heat to celebrate the memorable season in the streets of Phoenix.

Game log

|- align="center" bgcolor="#ffcccc"
| 1
| April 30
| L.A. Lakers
| L 103–107
| Charles Barkley (34)
| Charles Barkley (15)
| Knight, Majerle (5)
| America West Arena19,023
| 0–1
|- align="center" bgcolor="#ffcccc"
| 2
| May 2
| L.A. Lakers
| L 81–86
| three players tied (18)
| Charles Barkley (21)
| Kevin Johnson (16)
| America West Arena19,023
| 0–2
|- align="center" bgcolor="#ccffcc"
| 3
| May 4
| @ L.A. Lakers
| W 107–102
| Charles Barkley (27)
| Charles Barkley (11)
| three players tied (5)
| Great Western Forum17,505
| 1–2
|- align="center" bgcolor="#ccffcc"
| 4
| May 6
| @ L.A. Lakers
| W 101–86
| Charles Barkley (28)
| Charles Barkley (11)
| Kevin Johnson (6)
| Great Western Forum17,505
| 2–2
|- align="center" bgcolor="#ccffcc"
| 5
| May 9
| L.A. Lakers
| W 112–104 (OT)
| Charles Barkley (31)
| Barkley, Miller (14)
| Kevin Johnson (13)
| America West Arena19,023
| 3–2
|-

|- align="center" bgcolor="#ccffcc"
| 1
| May 11
| San Antonio
| W 98–89
| Kevin Johnson (25)
| Charles Barkley (10)
| Kevin Johnson (7)
| America West Arena19,023
| 1–0
|- align="center" bgcolor="#ccffcc"
| 2
| May 13
| San Antonio
| W 109–103
| Charles Barkley (35)
| Charles Barkley (10)
| Kevin Johnson (12)
| America West Arena19,023
| 2–0
|- align="center" bgcolor="#ffcccc"
| 3
| May 15
| @ San Antonio
| L 96–111
| Kevin Johnson (26)
| Charles Barkley (14)
| Kevin Johnson (7)
| HemisFair Arena16,057
| 2–1
|- align="center" bgcolor="#ffcccc"
| 4
| May 16
| @ San Antonio
| L 103–117
| Kevin Johnson (26)
| Charles Barkley (12)
| Kevin Johnson (8)
| HemisFair Arena16,057
| 2–2
|- align="center" bgcolor="#ccffcc"
| 5
| May 18
| San Antonio
| W 109–97
| Charles Barkley (36)
| Charles Barkley (12)
| Kevin Johnson (12)
| America West Arena19,023
| 3–2
|- align="center" bgcolor="#ccffcc"
| 6
| May 20
| @ San Antonio
| W 102–100
| Charles Barkley (28)
| Charles Barkley (21)
| Kevin Johnson (8)
| HemisFair Arena16,057
| 4–2
|-

|- align="center" bgcolor="#ccffcc"
| 1
| May 24
| Seattle
| W 105–91
| Cedric Ceballos (21)
| Charles Barkley (14)
| Dan Majerle (9)
| America West Arena19,023
| 1–0
|- align="center" bgcolor="#ffcccc"
| 2
| May 26
| Seattle
| L 99–103
| Dan Majerle (29)
| Barkley, Majerle (10)
| Charles Barkley (6)
| America West Arena19,023
| 1–1
|- align="center" bgcolor="#ccffcc"
| 3
| May 28
| @ Seattle
| W 104–97
| Kevin Johnson (20)
| Charles Barkley (16)
| Kevin Johnson (9)
| Seattle Center Coliseum14,812
| 2–1
|- align="center" bgcolor="#ffcccc"
| 4
| May 30
| @ Seattle
| L 101–120
| Charles Barkley (27)
| Charles Barkley (7)
| Kevin Johnson (7)
| Seattle Center Coliseum14,812
| 2–2
|- align="center" bgcolor="#ccffcc"
| 5
| June 1
| Seattle
| W 120–114
| Charles Barkley (43)
| Charles Barkley (15)
| Barkley, Johnson (10)
| America West Arena19,023
| 3–2
|- align="center" bgcolor="#ffcccc"
| 6
| June 3
| @ Seattle
| L 102–118
| Kevin Johnson (22)
| Charles Barkley (11)
| Kevin Johnson (4)
| Seattle Center Coliseum14,812
| 3–3
|- align="center" bgcolor="#ccffcc"
| 7
| June 5
| Seattle
| W 123–110
| Charles Barkley (44)
| Charles Barkley (24)
| Kevin Johnson (9)
| America West Arena19,023
| 4–3

|- align="center" bgcolor="#ffcccc"
| 1
| June 9
| Chicago
| L 92–100
| Charles Barkley (21)
| Richard Dumas (12)
| Charles Barkley (5)
| America West Arena19,023
| 0–1
|- align="center" bgcolor="#ffcccc"
| 2
| June 11
| Chicago
| L 108–111
| Charles Barkley (42)
| Charles Barkley (13)
| Kevin Johnson (6)
| America West Arena19,023
| 0–2
|- align="center" bgcolor="#ccffcc"
| 3
| June 13
| @ Chicago
| W 129–121 (3OT)
| Dan Majerle (28)
| Charles Barkley (19)
| Kevin Johnson (9)
| Chicago Stadium18,676
| 1–2
|- align="center" bgcolor="#ffcccc"
| 4
| June 16
| @ Chicago
| L 105–111
| Charles Barkley (32)
| Charles Barkley (12)
| Charles Barkley (10)
| Chicago Stadium18,676
| 1–3
|- align="center" bgcolor="#ccffcc"
| 5
| June 18
| @ Chicago
| W 108–98
| Dumas, Johnson (25)
| Dan Majerle (12)
| Kevin Johnson (8)
| Chicago Stadium18,676
| 2–3
|- align="center" bgcolor="#ffcccc"
| 6
| June 20
| Chicago
| L 98–99
| Barkley, Majerle (21)
| Charles Barkley (17)
| Kevin Johnson (10)
| America West Arena19,023
| 2–4
|-

NBA Finals
The 1993 NBA Finals was the championship round of the 1992–93 NBA season, featuring the Chicago Bulls, led by Michael Jordan, and the Phoenix Suns, winners of 62 games and led by regular season MVP Charles Barkley. The Bulls became the first team since the legendary Boston Celtics of the 1960s to win three consecutive championship titles, clinching the "three-peat" with John Paxson's game-winning 3-pointer that gave them a 99–98 victory in Game 6.
 The Phoenix Suns won game 3 in 3OT, 129–121. Suns Head Coach Paul Westphal became the only person to appear in both triple-overtime finals games. The first was Game 5 of the 1976 contest against Boston, as a player for the Suns, which thus were the only team to appear in two triple-overtime finals games. In 1976, the Suns lost 126–128 against Boston.
 The Bulls got off to a good start in Game 6 but struggled in the fourth quarter, wasting a double-digit lead to trail 98–94. Michael Jordan made a layup to cut the margin to 2 points, and the Suns missed a shot on their next possession. Trailing 98–96 and facing a Game 7 on the road if they lost that day, John Paxson took a pass from Horace Grant and buried a three pointer with 3.9 seconds left, giving the Bulls a 99–98 lead. The victory was secured by a last-second block from Horace Grant.
 Michael Jordan, who averaged a Finals-record 41.0 PPG during the six-game series, became the first player in NBA history to win three straight Bill Russell NBA Finals Most Valuable Player Awards. He joined Magic Johnson as the only other player to win the award three times. The NBA started awarding the Finals MVP in 1969.

Awards and honors

Week/Month
 Charles Barkley was named Player of the Week for games played December 7 through December 13.
 Charles Barkley was named Player of the Week for games played March 29 through April 4.
 Charles Barkley was named Player of the Month for December.
 Paul Westphal was named Coach of the Month for December.

All-Star
 Charles Barkley was voted as a starter for the Western Conference in the All-Star Game. It was his seventh All-Star selection. Barkley finished third in All-Star voting with 858,947 votes, behind only Michael Jordan (1,035,824) and Scottie Pippen (932,912).
 Dan Majerle was selected as a reserve for the Western Conference in the All-Star Game. It was his second All-Star selection.
 The other Suns player who received All-Star votes was Kevin Johnson (188,545).
 Paul Westphal coached the Western Conference All-Star team to a 135–130 victory over the East.
 Cedric Ceballos participated in the Slam Dunk Contest. After winning the 1992 contest, Ceballos made the final round, finishing third behind Clarence Weatherspoon and champion Harold Miner.
 Dan Majerle participated in the Three-Point Shootout, losing to champion Mark Price.

Season
 Charles Barkley received the Most Valuable Player Award.
 Jerry Colangelo received the Executive of the Year Award.
 Charles Barkley was named to the All-NBA First Team.
 Dan Majerle was named to the NBA All-Defensive Second Team. Majerle also finished fifth in Defensive Player of the Year voting.
 Richard Dumas was named to the NBA All-Rookie Second Team.
 Cedric Ceballos led the league in field goal percentage, making 57.6 percent of his shots.
 Dan Majerle led the league (tied with Reggie Miller) in three-point field goals with 167.
 Danny Ainge finished tied in second in Sixth Man of the Year voting.
 Tom Chambers finished fifth in Sixth Man of the Year voting.

Player statistics

Season

* – Stats with the Suns.
† – Minimum 300 field goals made.

Playoffs

† – Minimum 20 field goals made.

Transactions

Trades

Free agents

Additions

Subtractions

Player Transactions Citation:

References

 Suns on Database Basketball
 Suns on Basketball Reference

Phoenix Suns seasons
Western Conference (NBA) championship seasons